Worth tha Weight is the debut solo studio album by American rapper Shawnna. Originally scheduled to be released in 2002, it was delayed until 2004 and was released on September 28, 2004 by Def Jam Recordings and Disturbing tha Peace. Production was handled by several record producers, including B-Crucial, Just Blaze, Kanye West, Bangladesh, DJ Nasty & LVM, and Shawnna's brother Michael Antonio "Icedrake" Guy. It features guest appearances from Ludacris, Jermaine Dupri, Kardinal Offishall, Katt Williams, Missy Elliott, Noreaga, Rich Nice and Twista. The album peaked at number 22 on the Billboard 200 and, to date, has sold 380,000 copies to date in the U.S.

It was supported by two singles: Timbaland-produced "Shake Dat Shit" and Trackboyz-produced "Weight a Minute". The album contains three remixed tracks: "Posted" from DTP's 2002 compilation album Golden Grain, "Block Reincarnated" from the 2003 soundtrack album for John Singleton's action movie 2 Fast 2 Furious, and "Dude" from Beenie Man's 2004 album Back to Basics. The song "Let's Go" was featured on the 2004 video game Def Jam: Fight for NY, in which Shawnna also appeared as playable character.

Critical reception 

Worth tha Weight received positive reviews from music critics. K.B. Tindal of HipHopDX gave high praise to Shawnna's display of technical delivery and knowledgeable vocabulary throughout her debut, saying that "At the end of the day Shawnna comes through with a great display for a freshman release on the solo end. Def Jam does it again but don't get it twisted, DTP is what's really poppin'". Steve 'Flash' Juon of RapReviews praised Shawnna and the production team for elevating the material with lyrical dexterity and energetic beats, saying that "At eighteen tracks and nearly 60 minutes long, you're not left with the impression Shawnna said anything really profound, but she did say it in an enjoyable way over an impressive selection of beats". AllMusic editor Andy Kellman praised the album's production and Shawnna's skills as a rapper despite tracks like "Posted (Remix)" and "Kick This One" being weak contributions, concluding that "Even with these nagging flaws, Shawnna holds her own and is only complemented -- never outshined -- by the many guest MCs".

Track listing

Charts

References

External links

Shawnna albums
2004 debut albums
Def Jam Recordings albums
Disturbing tha Peace albums
Albums produced by Timbaland
Albums produced by Just Blaze
Albums produced by Kanye West
Albums produced by Jermaine Dupri
Albums produced by Terrace Martin
Albums produced by Bangladesh (record producer)
Albums produced by Dave Kelly (producer)